A Soldier's Daughter Never Cries is a 1998 drama film directed by James Ivory from a screenplay he co-wrote with Ruth Prawer Jhabvala. It stars Kris Kristofferson, Barbara Hershey, Leelee Sobieski and Jesse Bradford. The film is a fictionalized account of the family life of writer James Jones and is based on Kaylie Jones' novel of the same name.

Structured as a novel, the film is divided into three segments each named after a different protagonist. The plot follows an expatriate American family living in Paris during the 1960s and 1970s until their return and adjustment to life in New England, seen from the point of view of the daughter.

Plot
Bill Willis, a successful American novelist and World War II veteran, is living in Paris in the 1960s with his family. He is much loved by his free-spirited unpredictable wife Marcella. The couple, popular at the Paris cocktail party circuit, has a six-year-old daughter Channe (short for Charlotte Anne). Marcella yearns to have another child, but a series of miscarriages has made that difficult. However, the family circle expands when a six-year old French boy, Benoit, is brought to their home for adoption. The child's biological mother, a beautiful young single mother, has been unable to care for him and Benoit has been shipped through so many orphanages and foster homes that he initially does not unpack his suitcase. Having feared rejection, the little boy is surprised by the love he receives in his new surroundings. After Benoit becomes acclimated to his new family, he asks that his name be changed to Billy after his adopted father.

Billy's presence prompts the young Channe to turn to her protective Portuguese nanny, Candida. Initially jealous of her new brother, Channe quickly warms up to Billy inviting him to share her bed after he has wet his. Marcella physically confronts a stern teacher for the punitive measures she has taken against her son. Channe notices the culture clash at her bilingual school, the flirtatious circle of friends around her parents, the vulgarity of American children who come visit and an encounter with a budding French rapist who tries to seduce Channe with the help of large snails. (He insists that she take off her shirt and let them crawl on her skin.)

Billy and Channe become teenagers. A strong friendship develops between Channe and Francis Fortescue, a flamboyantly effeminate youth with a passion for opera. The fatherless Francis lives with his eccentric expatriate British mother. He helps Channe test her wings as a nonconformist. Fear of love makes Candida rejects a proposal of marriage from her long time suffering African boyfriend, Mamadou. As Channe begins to be interested in other boys, she distances herself from Francis who confesses to her that he had a little crush on her. The family's French idyll is disrupted when Bill Willis plans a return to the United States because he wants American doctors to treat his heart condition

The family moves to New England during the 1970s. Their future is threatened by Bill's declining health, Marcella's alcoholism, and the struggles of Channe and Billy to adapt to American high school. Billy, awkward and very reserved, is bullied at school. Channe drifts from boy to boy giving sex in exchange for acceptance until she falls for Keith, a fellow student who becomes her steady boyfriend. Immersed in the writing of a new novel, Bill is worried about the future of his family when he would be gone. The irregularity of Billy's adoption comes to haunt him. The boy's biological mother had him at fifteen from a relationship with a cousin and wrote a diary while pregnant. Bill has kept the diary all these years in anticipation of the day when his adopted son would want to know the truth about his origins. Channe's relationship with Keith fades away as she helps her sick father write his novel. Bill's death affects his wife and children deeply. Billy comes out of his reserve to take care of the house and helps his grief-stricken mother. Marcella, as her husband had wanted, gives Billy the diary to read, but he is uninterested. One evening, Channe, Marcella and Billy put a record on and begin to dance. Billy takes a quick peek at the diary.

Cast

Reception
The film garnered a favorable critical reaction, holding a fresh rating of 77% on Rotten Tomatoes based on 26 reviews. Metacritic gave the film an average score of 65/100, indicating "generally favorable reviews".

Roger Ebert of the Chicago Sun-Times rated the film three and half  stars out of a possible four, commenting: " The film's appeal is in the details. It re-creates a childhood of wonderfully strange friends, eccentric visitors, a Paris that was more home for the children than for the parents and a homecoming that was fraught for them all".

Online film critic James Berardinelli gave the film a favorable review, saying: " Not only was I touched by the characters and engrossed by their story during the 120 minutes they were on screen, but I could have easily spent another hour or two with them".

In the words of Jonathan Rosenbaum, writing for the Chicago Reader, "The three parts add up to a rather lumpy narrative, and the characters are perceived through a kind of affectionate recollection that tends to idealize them, but they're so beautifully realized that they linger like cherished friends".

References

External links
 
 
 
 
 
 

1998 films
1998 drama films
1998 independent films
1998 multilingual films
1990s American films
1990s British films
1990s English-language films
1990s French films
1990s French-language films
American drama films
American independent films
American multilingual films
British drama films
British independent films
British multilingual films
English-language French films
Films based on American novels
Films directed by James Ivory
Films set in the 1960s
Films set in the 1970s
Films set in North Carolina
Films shot in North Carolina
Films shot in France
Films with screenplays by James Ivory
Films with screenplays by Ruth Prawer Jhabvala
French drama films
French independent films
French multilingual films
French-language American films
Merchant Ivory Productions films